Thelidium is a genus of lichen-forming fungi in the family Verrucariaceae. The genus was circumscribed in 1855 by Italian lichenologist Abramo Bartolommeo Massalongo, who assigned Thelidium amylaceum as the type species.

Species
Thelidium amylaceum 
Thelidium carbonaceum  – Australia
Thelidium chibaense  – Japan
Thelidium decipiens 
Thelidium fontigenum 
Thelidium fumidum 
Thelidium heardense 
Thelidium helveticum 
Thelidium impressum 
Thelidium incavatum 
Thelidium izuense  – Japan
Thelidium litorale 
Thelidium luchunense  – China
Thelidium methorium 
Thelidium minimum 
Thelidium minutulum 
Thelidium nylanderi 
Thelidium papulare 
Thelidium pluvium  – Europe
Thelidium praevalescens 
Thelidium pyrenophorellum 
Thelidium pyrenophorum 
Thelidium rimosulum  – Europe
Thelidium robustum 
Thelidium sinense  – China
Thelidium uvidulum  – Nepal
Thelidium yunnanum  – China
Thelidium zwackhii

References

Verrucariales
Lichen genera
Taxa described in 1855
Taxa named by Abramo Bartolommeo Massalongo